Ben Lai is a Canadian comic book penciler who worked on series such as Sigil, Radix, Thor and X-Men.  His brother, Ray Lai, often inks his work.

In 2002, the Lai brothers were involved in a controversy when the Massachusetts Institute of Technology used an image from Radix #1 in a $50 million grant proposal for the development of battlefield armor for the United States military.

Bibliography
CrossGen Primer #1, (with writers Barbara Kesel and Ron Marz, CrossGen Comics, 2000)
CrossGenesis #1, (with writers Barbara Kesel and Ron Marz, CrossGen Comics, 2000)
CrossGen Sampler #1, (with writers Barbara Kesel and Ron Marz, CrossGen Comics, 2000)
Sigil #1-5, (with writer Barbara Kesel, CrossGen Comics, 2000)
Radix #1-3 (CrossGen comics, 2001–2002)
G.I. Joe Battle Files #2, (with writers Josh Blaylock and Scott Wherle, Devil's Due Publishing, 2002)
Guard Force #1, (with writer Chuck Austen, Marvel Comics, 2003)
Thor #61-62, 64–65, 67, 70, (with writer Dan Jurgens, Marvel Comics, 2003)
Ultimate X-Men #26, (with writer Mark Millar, Marvel Comics, 2003)
X-Men Unlimited #1, (with writer Tony Lee, Marvel Comics, 2004)
All-New Official Handbook of the Marvel Universe A-Z #6, (with various writers, Marvel Comics, 2006)
Ultimate Secrets #1, (with various writers, Marvel Comics, 2008)

References

External links

Ben Lai at the Comic Book Database
Ben Lai at the Marvel Digital Comics Unlimited creator index

Living people
Artists from Montreal
Canadian comics artists
Year of birth missing (living people)